Sandro Camasio, who also used the name Alessandro Camasio,  (5 April 1886 – 23 June 1917) was an Italian journalist and playwright. He first studied jurisprudence in his native Turin, but started out as a journalist for the Gazzeta di Torino and Gazzeta del Popolo. He joined Nino Oxilia in writing dramatic works, starting with the work Zingara and Addio Giovenezza. Some of his works were later converted into films. He died unexpectedly from meningitis.

References

1886 births
1913 deaths
Italian dramatists and playwrights
Italian journalists